Egerton Leigh may refer to:

Egerton Leigh (priest) (1702-1760), British clergyman and landowner 
Sir Egerton Leigh, 1st Baronet (1733–1781),  British colonial jurist, Attorney-General of South Carolina
Egerton Leigh (1815–1876), British army officer, landowner and politician

See also
Leigh baronets, of South Carolina (includes other baronets named Egerton Leigh)